Paralepidosteus is an extinct genus of prehistoric bony fish that lived from the Albian to the Campanian stage of the Early Cretaceous epoch.

See also

 Prehistoric fish
 List of prehistoric bony fish

References

Early Cretaceous fish
Semionotiformes
Prehistoric fish of Africa